Patiala Locomotive Works (PLW), (formerly Diesel-Loco Modernization Works (DLMW)), is located in Patiala in the Indian state of Punjab. It was set up in 1981 to extend the service life of diesel Locomotives of the Indian Railways and raise the level of their availability. It also started to manufactures of WAP 7 and WAG 9 locomotives.

Services
 Manufacture and supply of high quality components and sub-assemblies as spares.
 Manufacture of components hitherto imported achieving import substitution and timely availability
 Remanufacture of critical assemblies for the unit exchange system of the diesel locomotive's maintenance system of the railways
 Rebuilding locomotives and power packs, and retrofitting the locomotives with systems incorporating latest technological development
 Manufacturing the WAP 7 locomotives and starting its series from 39***. It is also manufacturing the WAG 9 locomotives too.

Products
Key:
  Loco currently in production
 
The designation of the locomotives follows the nomenclature in Indian Railways. Prototypes and individual vehicles are not listed.

Electric locomotives

See also
 Indian Railway Service of Mechanical Engineers
 Chittaranjan Locomotive Works
 Banaras Locomotive Works
 Diesel Locomotive Factory, Marhowrah
 Electric Locomotive Factory, Madhepura
 Integral Coach Factory, Chennai
 Modern Coach Factory, Raebareli
 Rail Coach Factory, Kapurthala
 Rail Wheel Factory, Yelahanka
 Rail Wheel Plant, Bela
 Titagarh Wagons, Titagarh
 List of locomotive builders by countries

References

External links
  Official website

Transport in Patiala
Patiala
Railway workshops in India
Economy of Punjab, India
1981 establishments in Punjab, India